Hopokoekau Beach is an unincorporated community in the town of Taycheedah, Fond du Lac County, United States. The community was named after Hopokoekau, the wife of Sabrevoir de Carrie, a mid-eighteenth century French Canadian army officer.

Images

Notes

Unincorporated communities in Fond du Lac County, Wisconsin
Unincorporated communities in Wisconsin